Loucas George is an American television director and producer.

Biography

Loucas is a member of the Directors Guild of America and has been a producer on a number of shows including Commander in Chief, Ed, The O.C., Early Edition, 12 Miles of Bad Road and Life.

Personal life
Loucas and his wife have two sons.

References

External links

American television directors
Living people
Year of birth missing (living people)